Franz Pfeiffer (born 25 November 1972 in Kösching, Germany) is a German physicist known for his contributions to the development of Phase-contrast X-ray imaging and its applications in biomedical research.

Research 
Pfeiffer contributed to the extension of known imaging modalities such as Differential interference contrast microscopy and Dark-field microscopy to the X-ray regime. In 2006 he demonstrated the feasibility of phase sensitive X-ray imaging with conventional, polychromatic X-ray sources and a grating interferometer. This enlarged the potential of X-ray phase imaging for clinical use as before the technique was only possible at synchrotron facilities. Pfeiffer further introduced the extraction of a supplementary signal (so-called "dark-field signal") sensitive to porous microstructure of a sample based on X-ray scattering. His research group at the Technical University Munich demonstrated a range of possible applications of the new modalities in medical and material research. 

Further Pfeiffer is known for his research in X-ray Ptychography, X-ray tensor tomography, grating-based Neutron interferometric imaging and iterative CT reconstruction algorithms. He is author and co-author of more than 250 scientific publications and inventor in several patents. 

In 2011 he was awarded the Leibniz Prize for his achievements in X-ray physics.

References 

1972 births
Living people
Gottfried Wilhelm Leibniz Prize winners
21st-century German physicists
Academic staff of the Technical University of Munich